James or Jim Jarvis may refer to:

James C. Jarvis (1787–1800), American midshipman posthumously honored by Congress
Bud Jarvis (James Alexander Jarvis, 1907–1983), Canadian ice hockey player
James Howard Jarvis II (1937–2007), United States federal judge
Jim Jarvis (born 1943), American basketball player
James Jarvis (illustrator) (born 1970), English illustrator, writer and entrepreneur
James Jarvis (cricketer) (1875–1962), English cricketer

See also
Jarvis James Hayes (born 1981), American basketball player
Jarvis (disambiguation)